Boshan is the southernmost district of the city of Zibo, in central Shandong province, China.

Description

BoShan is a district in southern Zibo City with a population of around 400,000 people. It is 42 kilometers south of the urban center of Zibo City: Zhang Dian.

Downtown BoShan has a wide central avenue which is divided by a park-like river with walkways, stone bridges and gazebos. A modern expressway bypassed the downtown area, and that has attracted development to the outskirts of the city.

BoShan's major industries are ceramics, industrial pumps, vacuum pumps, chemicals and pharmaceuticals.  They advertise themselves as being the Pump Capital of China.

History
In the early 20th century, BoShan was the administrative capital of the area. But BoShan is in the mountains while Zhang Dian is in a flat valley. Zhang Dian is on a main rail corridor, while BoShan was just a spur. So Zhang Dian replaced BoShan as a commercial and administrative center.

ShanDong was a German protectorate in the early 20th century, and in BoShan you can see traces of German influence.  Some of the major non-Chinese companies in town are German. Siemens was one of the largest companies in town, but that German company sold their BoShan factory to GardnerDenverNash in 2005. The train station looks like a Bavarian building. And the town still has a few small restaurants who brew their own beer, German style.

Around the beginning of the 21st century, new tall buildings were erected and old-styled-one-story houses pulled down.

As the reform of economic system was enforced further in Boshan, many traditional factories which once benefited much from the national policies' protection shut down with many workers losing their jobs. Recently, Boshan's government has been trying to promote the local tourist industry.

Administrative divisions
As 2012, this District is divided to 2 subdistricts and 11 towns.
Subdistricts
 Chengdong Subdistrict (城东街道)
 Chengxi Subdistrict (城西街道)

Towns

Climate

Tourism 
Attractions
Yuan Shan National Park is a mountain top park located in the center of BoShan.

The park features a reconstructed section of the Great Wall of Qi.  Near the Great Wall is an ocean of stones, strangely shaped limestones which used to be part of the ocean floor.  Because of these stones, Taoists put a temple on the mountain, and the park still has an old Taoist temple. Recently, a huge statue of Jiang Ziya (an important character in the legend stories of ancient China) has been erected at the North Gate of Yuan Shan National Park.

BoShan food is slightly different from other parts of China.  BoShan people do not eat hot peppery food.  They tend to prefer sour or salty dishes.  Some of the local dishes do have a lot of white pepper, a Chinese version of black pepper.  The most common kind of restaurants in BoShan are hot pot restaurants, a Chinese stew fondue.  Also, there are many seafood restaurants, as well as restaurants which specialize in BoShan food.

One favorite local dish is Pickled Vegetable Fish Soup.  It is a stew made from fish and pickled Chinese cabbage, with a variety of other vegetables thrown in.

BoShan is surrounded by mountains, and when the weather is warm, these mountains have many small outdoor restaurants located alongside mountain streams.  Tourists hike the mountains and, as they follow the streams, they have a selection of these small restaurants.  Dishes include range chickens (not commercially raised), fish, and sometimes locusts or scorpions from the forests.  Meals are served on small stone tables located under gazebos alongside the stream.

See also
 List of administrative divisions of Shandong

References

External links
  BoShan government's web page 
  BoShan - Land of Color Glaze
  Information Sheet on FDA-CNCA Memorandum of Understanding

County-level divisions of Shandong
Zibo